Pianello may refer to:

 Pianello, commune in the Haute-Corse department of France on the island of Corsica
 Pianello del Lario, municipality in the Province of Como in the Italian region Lombardy
 Pianello Val Tidone, municipality in the Province of Piacenza in the Italian region Emilia-Romagna